Johnstonville is an unincorporated community in Lamar County, in the U.S. state of Georgia.

History
Johnstonville was founded in 1821, and served as temporary county seat. A post office called Johnstonville was established in 1839, and remained in operation until 1905. The community most likely was named after one of two Johnston family of pioneer settlers.

References

Unincorporated communities in Lamar County, Georgia